Patora dam is located in Odisha. It is constructed across Jonk River in Patora village located 18 km from Nuapada in Nuapada district, Odisha in India.

See also
Brahmanpada,Nuapada
Odisha
Harishankar Temple
Nrusinghanath Temple
Nuapada
Khariar Road
Bolangir
Western Odisha
Bangomunda

External links
Odisha Government
Odisha Tourism

Dams in Odisha
Nuapada district
Year of establishment missing